is a Japanese manga series written and illustrated by Kenjiro Hata. It has been serialized in Shogakukan's Weekly Shōnen Sunday since September 2015. Hata published the series on a monthly basis, with a "first season" of 7 chapters published until May 2016. Hata stated that he will release a "second season", but it has not been decided when it will be published. Its chapters have been collected in one tankōbon volume as of February 2016.

Publication
Ad Astra per Aspera is written and illustrated by Kenjiro Hata. In July 2015, Hata announced that he would start a monthly series to be published in Shogakukan's Weekly Shōnen Sunday. Ad Astra per Aspera debuted in Weekly Shōnen Sunday on September 2, 2015. The series' "first season" ran for 7 chapters until May 11, 2016. The same day, Hata wrote that he will continue the series with a "second season", but it has not been decided when it will be released. Shogakukan collected the first five chapters in a tankōbon volume, released on February 18, 2016.

Volume list

Chapters not yet in tankōbon volumes
These chapters have yet to be published in a tankōbon volume. They were published in Weekly Shōnen Sunday in March and May 2016.

006. "Ambiguous"
007.

References

External links
 

Science fiction anime and manga
Shogakukan manga
Shōnen manga